Elvan Akyıldız (born 31 January 1977, Izmir (Turkey)) is a Dutch actress, presenter and cabaret performer of Turkish origin. She is best known for her role as Elvan on Sesamstraat, the Dutch co-production of Sesame Street.

Elvan Akyıldız plays in theatre group Hassan's Angels.

Filmography

Television

References

External links
 

1977 births
Living people
Dutch people of Turkish descent
Dutch television actresses
Turkish emigrants to the Netherlands
Actresses from İzmir